Northwestern High School is a public high school in Maple, Douglas County Wisconsin. It is part of Maple School District. The district serves the villages of Poplar and Lake Nebagamon; the unincorporated communities of Maple, Brule, and Iron River; and the counties of Douglas and Bayfield.

Notes

External links
Maple School District

Public high schools in Wisconsin
Schools in Douglas County, Wisconsin